The Kankakee Valley Conference, occasionally known as the Kankakee Valley Athletic Association, was an IHSAA-sanctioned conference in northwestern Indiana that lasted from 1933 until 1967. The conference formed as a merger of the Jasper and Newton county conferences, along with schools from the newly formed Porter County Conference wanting another league to compete in. The league would also add schools from Starke and White counties soon after forming. Other than adding LaCrosse from LaPorte County for a short time, the league did not stray from this footprint. The league was always closely tied with the Midwest Athletic Conference, with some schools playing in both conferences in the MAC's first incarnation, and many KVC schools either helped form the MAC's lineup in its reformation, or ended up moving to the league after the collapse of the KVC.

Membership

 Played concurrently in KVC and MAC 1933-47.
 Played concurrently in KVC and PCC throughout duration in KVC.
 Played concurrently in KVC and SCC 1935-48.
 Played concurrently in KVC and TVAC 1956-57.
 Played concurrently in KVC and TVAC 1956-59.
 Played concurrently in KVC and LCC 1943-49.

References

Resources
E.T. Pearl's Basketball Corner

Indiana high school athletic conferences
High school sports conferences and leagues in the United States
Indiana High School Athletic Association disestablished conferences
1933 establishments in Indiana
1967 disestablishments in Indiana